Glischrocaryon behrii,  or golden pennants, is a perennial herb, native to southeastern Australia. The 5 to 6 inflorescences that appear in spring each comprise 7 to 60 yellow flowers.

The species was first formally described by botanist Diederich von Schlechtendal in 1847 in Linnaea. He gave it the name Loudonia behrii. In 1970 the species was transferred to the genus Glischrocaryon.

References

Haloragaceae
Saxifragales of Australia
Flora of New South Wales
Flora of South Australia
Flora of Victoria (Australia)